Maggia may refer to:

Maggia (river), a river in southern Switzerland
Maggia (municipality), a municipality in southern Switzerland
Maggia (comics), a fictional crime syndicate in the Marvel Comics universe